Granatin may refer to:
 Granatin A, an ellagitannin found in pomegranate
 Granatin B, an ellagitannin found in pomegranate